Solitude Aeturnus is an American epic doom metal band from Arlington, Texas. Founded by John Perez in early 1987, the original lineup consisted of Perez on guitar, vocalist Kristoff (Christopher) Gabehart, guitarist Tom Martinez, drummer Brad Kane, and Chris Hardin on bass. The name Solitude was chosen to pay homage to the bands Black Sabbath and Candlemass, both of whom had songs bearing the name "Solitude".

Their vocalist, Robert Lowe, was also the singer for the doom metal band Candlemass between 2007 and 2012. Former drummer and bassist Lyle Steadham is now guitarist and lead vocalist for the band Ghoultown.

Biography
Formed in early 1987, the line up began as John Perez, quit his former seminal thrash metal band Rotting Corpse in early 1987. Perez, already a veteran in the metal scene, had begun to tire of the limitations of thrash and sought a new sound. Already a long time follower of the early 1980s classic doom groups like Witchfinder General, St. Vitus, Black Hole, Nemesis and the like, Perez decided to adopt a doom metal sound. Perez assembled a group of musicians over the next year namely; Brad Kane - drums (another member of the early 1980s thrash scene), Kris Gabehardt - vocals (previously with Satanic death metal band Death Tripper), Tom Martinez - guitar and Chris Hardin - bass. After writing songs and rehearsing up until December 1987, the band entered the studio in January 1988 to record their five song demo entitled "And Justice For All...". This title and demo preceded the Metallica album of the same name by some seven months. The band's name at this time was Solitude. It was two years later that the band were forced to change the name to Solitude Aeturnus.

After the release of the demo, various gigs around the local area followed. The response was lukewarm at best, since no one around the area knew what to think of the band. In late 1988, changes started to occur within the band, finally settling on a line up that consisted of Perez - guitars, Edgar Rivera - guitars, Robert Lowe - vocals, Lyle Steadham on bass and John "Wolf" Covington on drums. This line up lasted for the next seven years until 1996. Lyle Steadham joined the band on drums while Chris Hardin was still on bass. This particular line up recorded the second official demo of the band containing two tracks, "Mirror of Sorrow" and "Opaque Divinity". Lyle then moved over to bass duties as Hardin left the band and Covington joined.

This two song tape caught the attention of the independent label King Klassic. The band entered the Dallas Sound Lab in January 1990 to record their debut album, Into the Depths of Sorrow. The whole album was recorded for a sum of $3000 and done in seven days including the remix. Shortly after the album was delivered it suffered a delay due to King Klassic not having the money to put it out. After some shopping around the album eventually caught the attention of Roadrunner Records and a licensed deal followed by Solitude Aeturnus signing directly to Roadrunner followed. After numerous other delays the album finally saw the light of day in July 1991 a full year and half after the album was recorded. No tours followed although by this time the band had already written enough songs for a second album. In March 1992, the band entered Sound Logic recording studios to begin the sessions for the second album, Beyond the Crimson Horizon. The budget for this album was much greater and as a result the sound was improved. The album was released in July 1992 and eventually a US tour was set up in late November with  Paul Di'Anno's Killers. The tour lasted six weeks and was a success for the band. Shortly after, in February 1993, the band were dropped from Roadrunner. This came as a relief for the band as the proper support from Roadrunner never came their way. In December the band finally signed a new recording contract with up and coming label, Pavement Records.

The band decided to get away from their familiar surroundings and took off for England to record their third album, Through the Darkest Hour. Recorded in late March 1994 at Rhythm Studios, this showed a simpler and heavier direction.

Through the Darkest Hour received critical acclaim across the globe upon its release in August 1994. After a few months of negotiating, the band went on the road with Mercyful Fate for an extensive US tour. The tour lasted six weeks and shortly after the band embarked on their first tour of Europe with fellow doom band Revelation. After this tour the band went through a long break that would last until April 1996 when recording for the next album commenced. During this time Perez started his own Brainticket Records label as well as recording a solo album under the name of The Liquid Sound Company. The next album, Downfall was recorded in Dallas, Texas, and despite receiving praise once again for their efforts, the band were extremely dissatisfied with the end product. The songs suffered due to the production quality of the album being poor. After years of hard knocks and never ending struggles the band underwent their first (and only) major line up change.

Lyle Steadham left the band shortly after the recording of Downfall. Primarily because he was tired of the group's sound and eventually formed punk band the Killcreeps. The band continued on enlisting the services of Teri Pritchard in as temporary bassist. It was this line up that toured Europe in April 1996 with Swedish power metal band Morgana Lafey. Another unintentional break followed and a split from Pavement Records eventually occurred. During this time new bass player, Steve Moseley, a long time friend and fan of the band replaced Lyle. The band then signed on to German label Massacre Records in December 1997 and recorded what was to become their masterpiece, Adagio. This time going back to Rhythm Studios in England the album was recorded in March 1998 and released in June of the same year. The band toured Europe in September 1998 with Savior Machine in support of the record. Adagio finally saw a U.S. release in January 1999 through Olympic Records. Being distributed through Polygram, the Olympic deal gave the band even greater exposure in the native country.

The band has been on hiatus since 2011.

Members
Current members
 John Perez – guitars (1988–2011)
 Robert Lowe – lead vocals (1988–2011)
 Steve Moseley – bass (1998–2004), guitars (2004–2011)
 James Martin – bass (2005–2011)
 Steve Nichols – drums, percussion (2005–2011)

Former members
 Chris Hardin – bass (1988–1990)
 Lyle Steadham – bass (1990–1996), drums (1988–1989)
 Teri Pritchard – bass (1997)
 Kurt Joye – bass (2004–2005)
 John Covington – drums, percussion (1990–2005)
 Edgar Rivera – guitars (1989–1998)

Timeline

Discography

Studio albums
 Into the Depths of Sorrow (1991) (Reissued and expanded by Massacre records November 2006)
 Beyond the Crimson Horizon (1992) (Reissued and expanded by Massacre records November 2006)
 Through the Darkest Hour (1994)
 Downfall (1996)
 Adagio (1998)
 Alone (2006)

Other releases
 And Justice for All... (demo, 1988)
 Demo 89 (1989)
 Days of Doom (1994) (VHS tape featuring rare and unreleased performances and studio footage of the recording of their first three albums)
 Hour of Despair (DVD, 2007)
 In Times of Solitude (compilation, 2011)

References

American doom metal musical groups
Heavy metal musical groups from Texas
Musical groups established in 1987